Bernardo Schiavetta (Córdoba, Argentina, 1948) is an Argentine writer and psychiatrist who has lived in Paris since 1972.

Works 
Poetry
 Diálogo (Valencia, Prometeo, 1983) Premio Gules 1983
 Fórmulas para Cratilo (Madrid, Visor, 1990) Premio Loewe 1990
 Espejos (Madrid, Fundación Loewe, 1990).
 Entrelíneas (Córdoba, Argentina, Alción, 1992).
 Con mudo acento (Albacete, Barcarola, 1996). Premio Barcarola 1996.
 Texto de Penélope, diálogos con Didier Coste (Córdoba, Argentina, Alción, 1999).
Novel
 Gregorio Ruedas (in Antología de Literatura Fantástica Argentina del Siglo XX, Buenos Aires, Kapelusz, 1973).
Essay
 Le goût de la forme en littérature, Noésis, Paris, 2001.

References

External links
www.bernardo.schiavetta.com

1948 births
Living people
Argentine writers in French
People from Córdoba, Argentina
Argentine expatriates in France
Argentine psychiatrists